Samresan Pillay  (born 1941) is a former Fiji Indian soldier and teacher who has also been a member of the House of Representatives of Fiji.

He was born in Panang, Ra, Fiji and is the son of former National Federation Party parliamentarian and President, Ram Sami Goundar. After working for the Department of Agriculture, he joined the British Army in 1961. He left the army in 1969, returned to Fiji, and completed a Diploma in Education from the University of the South Pacific.

For the 1987 general election, the NFP–Labour Coalition chose him as a candidate for the Tavua/Vaileka Indian Communal Constituency which he won easily, but was a member of Parliament for a month when the military coup of 1987 put a halt to his political career.

References 

1941 births
Living people
Fijian Hindus
National Federation Party politicians
Indian members of the House of Representatives (Fiji)
University of the South Pacific alumni
Fijian Tamil politicians
Politicians from Ra Province